Sangha-Mbaéré is one of the 16 prefectures of the Central African Republic.  Its capital is Nola.

References

Central African Republic at GeoHive

 
Prefectures of the Central African Republic